Alrance is a hydroelectric power station in the commune of Alrance, Aveyron, southern France. It lies at the head of the Lac de Villefranche-de-Panat which it feeds: it draws water through 10.8 km long penstocks from the Lac de Pareloup.

See also

Le Pouget (power station)
Lac de Saint-Amans
Renewable energy in France

References

External links
 Hydroweb Bassin Tarn-Agout in French

Buildings and structures in Aveyron
Hydroelectric power stations in France